RKHV Quintus is a handball club from Kwintsheul, Netherlands. Both men and woman's team compete in the highest league in the Netherlands; Eredivisie.

Women's handball team

Honours

Lotto Eredivisie:
Winners (2): 2006, 2007 

Beker van Nederland :
Winners (4): 1979, 2006, 2007, 2008

 Dutch Supercup
 Winners (2) : 2006, 2007

European record

Notable former players
  Yvette Broch
  Maura Visser
  Kelly Dulfer
  Marieke van der Wal 
  Jurswailly Luciano
 Rinka Duijndam

Men's handball team

Crest, colours, supporters

Kits

References

External links
Official website 

Dutch handball clubs
Sports clubs in South Holland